Akola fort (also called Asadgad) along with the Narnala and Akot forts forms the major fortifications of the Akola district, Maharashtra, India.

History 

The fortress was built in 1697 by Asad Khan, during the reign of Aurangzeb by Asad Khan, from whom the fort took its name (Asadgad). In 1803, Arthur Wellesley camped here before proceeding to win the Battle of Argaon in the Second Anglo-Maratha War. The fortress was dismantled by the British Raj in about 1870. It was reported in 1910 in a district gazetteer that the central part of the fort (the hawakhana) was  used as a school.

Major features 
Akola fort is notable in that it is bereft of any decorative embellishments.

There are several inscriptions on the fort. An inscription on the Dahi handa gate gives its date of construction as 1114 AH (1697 CE)deepak, 'during the reign of emperor Aurangzeb when Nawab Asad Khan was minister.' Another on the Fateh Buruj bastion has no exact date. It too mentions the same minister but a different emperor (Shah Alam). One on the Eidgah contains texts and a statement that the building was finished by Khawja Abdul Latif in  1116 AH (1698 CE). On the Agarves gate an inscription in Marathi reads that  Govind Appaji in 1843 CE constructed the fort. The latter statement contradicts all the other inscriptions.

Shri Raj Rajeshwar Mandir
Akola's oldest Shiva temple is Rajeshwar Mandir.
The Shiv temple was built by Chola Empire king Raj Rajeswar.

Folklore
While King Akolsingh was living in the Asadgad Fort, there is a famous story associated with this payas temple. Every night his queen went to this temple to worship Shiva at midnight. Once King Akolsingh thought that his queen was going out at midnight for illicit reasons, so he followed her with a sword; the queen realised that King Akolsingh was following her. She felt gloomy and guilty and went straight to the Shiva temple and pleaded to the god that her husband the king was thinking wrong about her, and that it was insulting that he was having no faith in her loyalty and her character. So she pleaded to be allowed into Shiva's Pind (Shiva Ling) (a stone of God Shiva that is worshipped)". The Shiva ling broke in two parts and the queen jumped in, and then it was closed. The king understood his mistake and could not forgive himself. Still the Shiva ling in this temple has a little crack which is said to corroborate this story. This temple is the base aastha of this Akola city. There are 2 bridges: the first one is the dagadi pool (stone bridge) (also known as 'chota pool' meaning smaller bridge) and the other is lokhand pool (iron bridge) (also known as 'motha pool' meaning bigger bridge). This iron bridge was built at the time of British rule.

See also 

List of forts in Maharashtra

References 

Forts in Maharashtra
Akola district